William Washington (1752-1810), was an American cavalry officer

William Washington may also refer to

 William Henry Washington (1813-1860), Whig Congressman from North Carolina
 William D. Washington (1833-1870), American painter associated with the Virginia Military Institute
 William Washington (baseball) (born 1885), American baseball catcher
 William Washington (painter) (1885-1956), British painter

See also
 Washington (disambiguation)